Scymnosaurus (  'lion cub' + ,  'lizard') is an extinct genus of therocephalian therapsids,  first described by Robert Broom in 1903. There are three species that still take the name Scymnosaurus, S. ferox, S. watsoni and S. major, with a fourth, S. warreni, now identified as Moschorhinus warreni. Each of these have now been reclassified into Lycosuchidae incertae sedis.

Scymnosaurus is estimated to have been approximately the size of the modern day hyena, and possessed teeth suggesting that it was carnivorous. S. ferox was initially described as the second largest therocephalian, until the discovery of S. major, which is likely the largest therocephalian.

It is notable that throughout the 19th century, Broom was involved with the work done with therocephalians and their classifications, and re-classifications, with paper and book publications ranging from 1903 to 1950.

Geology 
Unfortunately, in his initial description, Broom states the holotype fossil of S. ferox is from an unknown locality. This specimen, like many fossils of Scymnosaurus, is only of the anterior portion of the skull.

Later Scymnosaurus fossils have been recovered and recorded as coming from the Tapinocephalus Assemblage Zone, many specifically from the Beaufort Group in South Africa. One specimen of S. ferox (SAM-PK-9084) and two S. major specimens, (SAM-PK-9005 and SAM-PK-10556) are from Beaufort West. Prince Albert, an area southeast of the Beaufort group, produced one S. ferox fossil (SAM-PK-3430).

The Beaufort group is a portion of the Karoo Basin Super group in South Africa. It represents from between 270-mya and 265ya to the middle of the Triassic. The Tapinocephalus Assemblage Zone where Scymnosaurus fossils and other therapsids are found is the thickest layer of the Beaufort group. The Tapinocephalus AZ represents the middle Permian.

Chemical analyses of the sediment in the Beaufort group suggests that the climate changed from glacial to post-glacial in the Early Permian, creating a marine environment in the Karoo Basin. There is evidence this change in climate lead to a vegetation explosion, from soil acidity measurements. Moving into the middle Permian, the climate changed from a warm-humid climate to warm-arid, and the environment became terrestrial, supporting the Therapsids that are now found in the Tapinocephalus Assemblage Zone.

History 
In his 1903 publication, Broom argued for the establishment of a new taxon, Therocephalia, based on the palatal differences with Therapsida of three similar genera, Scylacosaurus, Ictidosaurus and Scymnosaurus. Therocephalia is still used as a descriptor to place some extinct Therapsids, However, Scymnosaurus has been moved into the Lycosuchidae incertae sedis.

Scymnosaurus is still a name used for specimen today because it is the name that was applied to the holotype fossil.

S. watsoni was first classified coming from Lycosuchia, renamed as S. Watsoni, before being re-described as Lycosuchidae incertae sedis.

Paleobiology 
Despite having only a partial fossil, it has been said that Scymnosaurs were likely not endothermic for the lack of a secondary palate. The higher metabolic load associated with endothermy is associated with characters such as fur, increased aerobic capacity and the development of a secondary palate, which allows for airflow independent of oral food processing. It is, however, still unclear as to the order acquired characters that allowed the development of faster metabolisms, which happened at least twice with birds and mammals.

S. ferox 
The first of S. ferox, SAM-PK-632, from Broom's 1903 description, is of a partial snout and lower jaw tip. This species has been moved to Lycosuchidae.

Dentition 
The premaxilla carries five incisors each, and maxillary bones hold the canine and three molars. Broom notes that there is evidence of a lost secondary canine on one of the maxillary bones, due to the apparent remains of its root, almost filled in with spongy bone. This second molar is later refuted as the remains of a baby tooth, which is also seen in Lycosuchidae. The 3rd, 4th and 5th incisors have serrations, with increasing flatness toward the maxilla (5th being the flattest). The molars are sharp, flattened and have serrations on their posterior borders, suggesting a carnivorous diet.

Palate 
The internal nares is visible on the specimen, formed by the prevomers and palatine bones. According to Broom, which has since been refuted, the prevomers are wider than in Scylacosauridae. There is no indication of a secondary palate. Broom notes only the anterior portion of the pterygoid is present in the holotype specimen. The palatine bone forms a crest and lacks palatal dentition.

S. major 
It has also been moved to Lycosuchidae incertae sedis. The holotype of S. major is SAM-10566.

Dentition 
The premaxillary bones have five incisors each, and maxillary bones hold two canines and one preserved post canine.

Palate 
There are minimal notes on skull characters as S. major skulls are "badly weathered".

S. watsoni 
S. watsoni was initially described as an example of lycosuchidae, placed in Scymnosauridae by Broom in 1915, to be returned to Lycosuchidae incertae sedis. The holotype fossil is BMNH R4100.

Dentition 
Like S. ferox, it has five incisors, with a single canine followed by three preserved post canines.

Palate/Post-orbital 
The most notable features are large temporal fenestrae, a narrow snout, and a high parietal crest.

S. warreni 
Incorrectly described and corrected by Broom as Scymnosaurus, now referred to as Moschorhinus warreni.

See also

 List of therapsids
 Lycosuchidae
 Therapsids
 Therocephalians
 Permian

References

 The main groups of non-mammalian synapsids at Mikko's Phylogeny Archive

Scylacosaurids
Therocephalia genera
Permian synapsids of Africa
Fossil taxa described in 1903
Taxa named by Robert Broom